Princess Muna Al-Hussein (born Toni Avril Gardiner; 25 April 1941) is the mother of Abdullah II of Jordan. She was the second wife of King Hussein; the couple divorced on 21 December 1972. She is British by birth, and changed her name to Muna Al-Hussein upon marriage.

Early life
Muna Al-Hussein was born in Chelmondiston, Suffolk, England, the daughter of Doris Elizabeth (née Sutton) and Lieutenant colonel Walter Percy "Tony" Gardiner. She attended Bourne School in Kuala Lumpur, Malaysia, which was administered by the British Families Education Service for the children of British service personnel stationed overseas, where she was an A-grade field hockey player. The school closed when British forces withdrew from Malaya.

Gardiner's father was a British Army officer who finished his career with the rank of Lieutenant colonel. He was the son of Arthur Gardiner, a gamekeeper. He joined the Royal Engineers at the age of 17, and was stationed in Mandatory Palestine for 18 months in the 1930s. He later served in France, North Africa, and Italy during World War II.

Marriage and children
Gardiner met the King of Jordan, Hussein, while working as a secretarial assistant on the film set of Lawrence of Arabia. The King had allowed his troops to work as extras on this film and would occasionally visit to monitor the production's progress. However, there is another report, stating that Gardiner and the King met when her father began to work as a military adviser in Jordan.

Gardiner married King Hussein in Amman, Jordan, on 25 May 1961. Together they had four children:

 Abdullah (born 1962; now King Abdullah II of Jordan)
 Faisal (born 1963)
 Aisha and Zein (twins, born 1968)

They were divorced on 21 December 1972. She continues to work and live in Jordan.

Causes and activities
She is involved in the development of nursing in Jordan, founding the Princess Muna Scholarship Fund for Nursing. In 1962, she founded the Princess Muna College of Nursing, now the Princess Muna College of Nursing and Allied Health Professions.

Honours

National
 :
 Knight Grand Cordon with Collar of the Order of al-Hussein bin Ali
 Knight Grand Cordon of the Supreme Order of the Renaissance, Special Class

Foreign
  Greek Royal Family:
 Dame Grand Cross of the Royal Order of Beneficence
  Iranian Imperial Family:
 Recipient of the Commemorative Medal of the 2,500 year Celebration of the Persian Empire
 :
 Honorary Dame Grand Cordon of the Order of the Defender of the Realm
  Romanian Royal Family:
 Extra Dame Grand Cross of the Royal Order of the Crown
 :
  Member Grand Cross of the Order of the Polar Star (15 November 2022)
 :
 Grand Cross of the Order of the Republic

References

External links

Ancestry of Antoinette Avril Gardiner (b. 1941)
King Hussein – His Early Life

1941 births
Living people
Hussein of Jordan
Jordanian people of English descent
Jordanian princesses
Jordanian royal consorts
People from Babergh District
Grand Crosses of the Order of the Crown (Romania)
Grand Crosses of the Order of Beneficence (Greece)
Converts to Islam
Princesses by marriage
British emigrants